The Saltburn Miniature Railway is a  gauge railway at Saltburn, in Redcar and Cleveland, North Yorkshire, England.

History
The railway opened in 1947 as a tourist attraction. It was originally a simple out-and-back line with a station at each end. During 1953 the line was adapted to allow the simultaneous operation of two trains, though without the provision of a passing loop. Instead, a single siding was provided into which one train had to reverse to allow the other to pass by.

During the 1980s the operation of the railway was taken over by an Association of supporters, all of whom are volunteers. A decision was made to extend the railway, relocate one terminus completely, and provide new sidings and engine sheds. This major project, known on the railway as 'The Big Transformation' took place between September 2000 and April 2003.

Route
There is a run around loop at each end of the line and an engine and rolling stock depot near the midpoint.

Locomotives
Prince Charles was the only serviceable mainline locomotive on the railway, and had been the principal engine continuously since 1953. However, the new operators have provided a lightweight engine for works trains, and have also obtained a new mainline engine, "Saltburn 150", bought from CCLR as derelict has been rebuilt by SMRA and is now in service. A part built steam engine a 4-4-2 Atlantic type has been purchased and rebuilt by SMRA and is now in service as "Blacklock R" .

Other rolling stock
The passengers carried in the first season (1947) were obliged to sit in freight wagons – scale model 7-plank open wagons, with crude cross-bar seats fitted. However, for the 1948 season the railway acquired two bogie passenger coaches with reversible seats whose backs could be tipped to allow the passenger to face the direction of travel. In 1953 the railway took delivery of four new passenger coaches, each seating 16 passengers (in 4 compartments of 4 seats each); at a subsequent, but unknown, date the two earlier coaches were withdrawn. When the current operators took over the line they made temporary use of the last two serviceable coaches of 1953 vintage, though these have since been withdrawn. There are now four passenger coaches, all of modern build and metal construction. Three are enclosed, and one is open. Three of these coaches have exterior platforms for a guard or guards to travel upon.

The 1948 coaches operated with a replica brake van, since withdrawn. Today the railway has three works wagons – a general works truck, a tanker truck, and an air compressor wagon.

References

External links

Aerial view of route
Aerial view of Cat Nab Station
Aerial view of locomotive and carriage depot
Aerial view of Forest Halt

Miniature railways in the United Kingdom
15 in gauge railways in England
Tourist attractions in North Yorkshire
Saltburn-by-the-Sea